David Lee Roth is an American rock music singer. His discography consists of six studio albums, one extended play, one compilation album, and 20 singles. Of his eight albums, four have been certified Gold or higher by the Recording Industry Association of America. Eat 'Em and Smile, Skyscraper, and Crazy from the Heat are certified Platinum, and A Little Ain't Enough is certified Gold. As of 2012, all of David Lee Roth's Warner Brothers LPs are due for recertification.

Roth has released 20 singles, with four of those reaching the Top 40 on the US Billboard Hot 100. His debut single, 1985's "California Girls", reached number 3 on Hot 100, and 1988's "Just Like Paradise" reached number 6 on the same chart. "Just Like Paradise" is also Roth's first (and only to date) number-one single on any Billboard chart. It reached number one on the Billboard Hot Mainstream Rock Tracks chart. Most of his singles have experienced international chart success, most notably in Canada and New Zealand, where Roth has several Top 20 hits in both countries.

Since the release of Diamond Dave (2003), Roth has put out many non-album singles since 2020, but released no further albums. In 2006, he re-joined Van Halen—the band that he helped propel to international superstardom—and then toured extensively. Roth's first full-length album with Van Halen since 1984, A Different Kind of Truth, was released on February 7, 2012, to widespread commercial and critical success.

12 of Roth's albums have been certified Gold in the US by the RIAA and 11 have been certified Platinum in the US by the RIAA (Van Halen and solo combined).

Albums

Studio albums

Compilation albums

Extended plays

Singles

Video singles

Other appearances
Studio appearances
Strummin' with the Devil: The Southern Side of Van Halen – vocals on "Jump" and "Jamie's Cryin'" (2006)
"Ashley" – charity recording, recorded 1999, released 2012
Guest appearance
Live at Ultra Music Festival Miami 2019 (Highlights) – Appeared onstage with Armin van Buuren during the remix of "Jump" (2019)

Video albums

with Van Halen

Studio albums
 Van Halen (1978)
 Van Halen II (1979)
 Women and Children First (1980)
 Fair Warning (1981)
 Diver Down (1982)
 1984 (1984)
 A Different Kind of Truth (2012)

Notes

References

Discography
Discographies of American artists
Rock music discographies